Deena Mapple (born Deena Brush March 2, 1960) is a retired American competitive water skier. She is regarded to be one of the greatest female water skiers of her generation. Her Grand Slam Victory in 1987 - overall wins in the World Championships, U.S. Nationals, U.S. Masters and the Pro Tour - made her one of two athletes to ever accomplish the feat. She remains the only American to earn membership to the United States Waterskiing Team seven consecutive times.

Marriage 
In 1987, Brush married Andy Mapple, who would eventually be a six-time world water skiing champion, and a 14 time Masters Slalom Champion himself. After the marriage, she variously became referred to as Deena Brush Mapple, Deena Brush-Mapple and Deena Mapple.

Tournament results

Masters
 1978 Masters Jump Champion
 1979 Masters Slalom Champion
 1979 Masters Jump Champion
 1983 Masters Slalom Champion
 1983 Masters Overall Champion
 1985 Masters Slalom Champion
 1985 Masters Overall Champion
 1986 Masters Jump Champion
 1986 Masters Overall Champion
 1987 Masters Jump Champion
 1987 Masters Overall Champion
 1988 Masters Jump Champion
 1988 Masters Overall Champion
 1989 Masters Jump Champion
 1990 Masters Jump Champion
 1990 Masters Overall Champion
 1992 Masters Jump Champion
 1992 Masters Overall Champion
 1993 Masters Jump Champion
 1993 Masters Overall Champion

World championships
 1981 World Jump Champion
 1985 World Jump Champion
 1987 World Jump Champion
 1987 World Overall Champion
 1989 World Jump Champion
 1989 World Overall Champion

See also

 Andy Mapple
 Waterskiing
 World water skiing champions
 Masters Waterski and Wakeboard Tournament
 List of Water Skiing Hall of Fame Inductees
 USA Water Ski
 United States Waterskiing Team

References

External links
 

1960 births
Living people
American water skiers